William Edward Vaughan is an Irish historian and emeritus fellow of Trinity College Dublin who studies the Land War and related topics.

Works

References

20th-century Irish historians
21st-century Irish historians
Trinity College Dublin
Year of birth missing (living people)
Historians of the Land War
Living people
Fellows of Trinity College Dublin